The Buenos Aires International Festival of Independent Cinema (BAFICI) is an international festival of independent films organized each year in the month of April, in the city of Buenos Aires, Argentina.

The festival is managed by the Ministry of Culture of the Government of Buenos Aires City. It is not officially affiliated with FIAPF, but it has become well known internationally.

History
The festival had its first edition in April 1999 and it was organized by the Secretaryship of Culture of the Government of Buenos Aires City. The festival is held in the most important movie theatres of Buenos Aires, but also feature free open-air screenings in parks and squares all over the city.

In the first year the festival had 146 guests, among them Francis Ford Coppola, Todd Haynes, Paul Morrissey and others. That year the festival screened more than 150 national and international films and had approximately 120,000 spectators. Since then the festival has been growing, reaching an audience of 1.1 million spectators in the 2013 edition.

Nowadays the BAFICI feature more than 400 films, several activities were added over the years and many conferences and workshops are held every year. With a great number of spectators and guests, the festival is permanently added into the Buenos Aires list of cultural events.

Awards
The festival has several competitive sections of which the "International Competition" and the "Argentinian Competition" are the most important ones. Inside each competitive section a jury evaluates the films and select the winners of several awards, including: Best Film, Best Director, Best Actor, Best Actress and Special Mentions. In the BAFICI the audiences vote, the  feature-length film with the highest ratings given by the audience receives the Audience Award.

Since the third festival there have been awards given to Short films, which include Best Short Subject Film and Best Director.

International Competition Best Film Winners

Complete List of winners

External links

 Official Website 
 Buenos Aires International Festival of Independent Cinema at Internet Movie Database

Film festivals in Argentina
Argentine film awards
Festivals in Buenos Aires
Autumn events in Argentina